Cusma or CUSMA may refer to:

Trade Agreements
 CUSMA, the Canada-United States-Mexico Agreement, also known as USMCA.

Places
 Cușma, a village in the commune Livezile, Bistrița-Năsăud County, Romania
 Cușma, a tributary of the river Tănase in Bistrița-Năsăud County, Romania

People
 Elisa Cusma (born 1981), Italian runner

See also
 Kusma (disambiguation)
 Kuzma (disambiguation)